The Open Source University Meet-Up was a student developer organization sponsored by Sun Microsystems that educated its members about open-source technologies through technical demonstrations, access to web courses, and discounts on Sun Certification.

History
Sun started the Open Source University Meet-Up as part of its program to help connect students in computer science to its technologies. Typically led by a campus ambassador or on-campus volunteer, Open Source University Meet-Ups exist in many countries.

Purpose
The Open Source University Meet-Up was a place for Sun to connect student developers to Sun’s wide array of open source software platforms, following Sun’s initiatives to open-source all of its software technologies. As a whole it also helped give software developers, students, and other interested people an opportunity to learn more about open source software.

See also
MSDN Academic Alliance

References

External links 
 
 OSUM Network
 http://www.uleth.ca/notice/display.html?b=302&s=10721
 http://www.iowaosum.com

Sun Microsystems
Academic organizations based in the United States
Free and open-source software organizations